Distefano is a surname. Notable people with the surname include:

Benny Distefano (born 1962), American baseball player
Chris Distefano (born 1984), American comedian
David Distéfano (born 1987), Argentine footballer
Tony DiStefano (born 1957), American motocross racer

Spanish-language surnames
Italian-language surnames
Surnames from given names